Killarney is a small town in south-western Victoria, located  south-west of Melbourne on the Princes Highway. At the time of the 2006 census the population of the district was 793.

Killarney was most likely named in the 19th century after Killarney in Ireland by Irish settlers. The main produce of the district is dairy farming, but sheep farming, cattle farming and grain farming do take place as well. Killarney has a beach which is accessible via Mahoneys Road. There is a pub, an antiques shop (Shipahoy's Antiques Centre), the restaurant Christopher Grace, and self-contained cottage accommodation in Calgary House and Cottage. The town has a cricket team competing in the Grassmere Cricket Association.

References 

Towns in Victoria (Australia)
Coastal towns in Victoria (Australia)